Eucalyptus calcareana, commonly known as the Nundroo mallee or Nundroo gum, is a mallee or a small tree that is endemic to the south coast of Australia. It has smooth, greyish or cream-coloured bark, lance-shaped or curved adult leaves, flower buds in groups of seven or nine, creamy-white flowers and cup-shaped to conical fruit.

Description
It has smooth grey, cream-coloured, white and orange bark that is shed in short ribbons. Flowering mainly occurs in March and April and the flowers are creamy white.

Taxonomy and naming
Eucalyptus calcareana was first formally described in 1979 by Clifford Boomsma from specimens collected near Nundroo. The specific epithet (calcareana) is derived from the Latin word calcareus meaning "of lime" or "limy" referring to the soil type where this species grows.

Distribution and habitat
Nundroo mallee is found along the south coast of the Goldfields-Esperance region of Western Australia and the south coast of South Australia. It is found from the east of Esperance to coastal areas of the western Eyre Peninsula.

Use in horticulture
This eucalypt is grown in exposed locations and is suitable as a windbreak or shade tree.

See also
List of Eucalyptus species

References

calcareana
Flora of South Australia
Mallees (habit)
Myrtales of Australia
Eucalypts of Western Australia
Trees of Australia
Goldfields-Esperance
Plants described in 1979